Spartak Timofeyevich Belyaev (October 27, 1923 – January 5, 2017) was a Soviet and Russian theoretical physicist who was awarded a Lomonosov Gold Medal.

Biography
Belyaev was born on October 27, 1923 in Moscow, Russia. When World War II began, he graduated from high school and by August 1941 enlisted himself into the Army as a volunteer. During that time he participated in various battles in Caucasus and liberation of Poland in 1945. After long years of war, he declined the offer on keeping the career and instead decided to become a physicist by applying to the Moscow State University. 

Two years later he already got a job there as a researcher at the Atomic Energy Institute which later on was renamed as Kurchatov Institute. He worked there till 1962 and between that year and 1958 also worked at the Niels Bohr Institute in Copenhagen. In 1962 he decided to change his lifestyle a bit; he moved to Siberia and in 1968 was elected as a full member of Russian Academy of Sciences. He worked at the Budker Institute of Nuclear Physics. For his breakthroughs and research in physics he was awarded the Landau Gold Medal in 1998 and the Feenberg medal in 2004. 

On May 17, 2011 he and Gerard 't Hooft were awarded a Lomonosov Gold Medal by the Russian Academy of Sciences.

References

1923 births
2017 deaths
20th-century Russian physicists
21st-century Russian physicists
Full Members of the Russian Academy of Sciences
Full Members of the USSR Academy of Sciences
Moscow Institute of Physics and Technology alumni
Recipients of the Lomonosov Gold Medal
Recipients of the Order "For Merit to the Fatherland", 4th class
Recipients of the Order of Lenin
Recipients of the Order of the Red Banner of Labour
Recipients of the Order of the Red Star
Russian physicists
Soviet physicists

Deaths from pneumonia in Russia
Burials in Troyekurovskoye Cemetery
Scientists from Moscow
Scientists from Novosibirsk